Isabel Wood Holt (1899–1996) was the wife of former Governor of West Virginia Homer A. Holt and served as that state's First Lady, 1937-1941.  She was born January 23, 1899, at Charlottesville, Virginia.  In 1924, she married Homer A. Holt.  As first lady, she dedicated most of her time to raising their three young children ((Julia Kinsley Holt (Coyle), Isabel Drury Holt (Dannenberg) and Robert Byrne Holt)).  After leaving office, the Holts remained in Charleston, West Virginia, where the former governor practiced law.  Following his death in 1975, Isabel remained in Charleston in her home on Bridge Road. She kept a garden on the place and grew the World's best tomatoes and canteloupes according to her grandson, Claiborne Holt Coyle.  Isabel Wood Holt died on September 5, 1996 and was buried in Lewisburg, West Virginia.

References

1899 births
1996 deaths
People from Charlottesville, Virginia
First Ladies and Gentlemen of West Virginia
People from Charleston, West Virginia
20th-century American women
20th-century American people